The Pro-Wrestling: EVE Tag Team Championship is a women's professional wrestling tag team championship created and promoted by the British professional wrestling promotion Pro-Wrestling: EVE. On 5 March 2022, Wrestle Friends (Erin Angel and Jetta) became the inaugural champions after defeating Diamond Vogue Collective (Jinny and Mercedez Blaze) and Medusa Complex (Charli Evans and Millie McKenzie) in a three-way tag team match. Since then, there has been seven reigns shared among six teams and 12 wrestlers.

The team of Laura Di Matteo and Rayne Leverkusen are the current champion in their first reign, both as a team and individually.

History 
On 5 March 2022, Wrestle Friends (Erin Angel and Jetta) became the inaugural champions after defeating Diamond Vogue Collective (Jinny and Mercedez Blaze) and Medusa Complex (Charli Evans and Millie McKenzie) in a three-way tag team match. Since then, there have been eight reigns shared among seven teams and 14 wrestlers.

Reigns

Combined reigns 

By team

By wrestler

References 

Women's professional wrestling tag team championships